Nigerian Film Corporation is a government owned agency that regulates Nigerian films. It was established in 1979 under decree number 61 of the 1979 constitution.

References 

Government agencies established in 1979
1979 establishments in Nigeria
Organizations based in Jos